Events from the year 1934 in the United Kingdom.

Incumbents
 Monarch – George V
 Prime Minister – Ramsay MacDonald (Coalition)
 Parliament – 36th

Events
 1 January – establishment of the National Council for Civil Liberties by Ronald Kidd and Sylvia Crowther-Smith.
 21 January – ten thousand people attend a British Union of Fascists rally in Birmingham, organised by Oswald Mosley.
 27 March – the 1934 Betting and Lotteries Act is passed. Part 1 (betting) is designed to restrict betting on racecourses and tracks to a maximum of 104 days. Part 2 (lotteries) prohibits the sale of lottery tickets, primarily directed against the Irish Free State Hospitals' Sweepstake. 
 April – Meccano Ltd introduce the first Dinky Toys.
 3 April – Percy Shaw patents the cat's eye road-safety device.
 6 April – Rudyard Kipling and William Butler Yeats are awarded the Gothenburg Prize for Poetry.
 21 April
 the "surgeon's photograph" of the Loch Ness Monster, much later admitted to be a hoax, is published in the Daily Mail.
 David Low's cartoon character Colonel Blimp first appears in the London Evening Standard.
 May – The London Zoo penguin pool, designed by Berthold Lubetkin's Tecton Architectural Group with Ove Arup, one of the most significant examples of modern architecture in Britain.
 4 May – fifty-four-year-old grandmother Mrs G. E. Alington becomes the first woman in Britain to complete a parachute jump, skydiving from 1500 feet over Brooklands Aerodrome.                 
 28 May – opening of first Glyndebourne Festival Opera season.
 29 May – first regular domestic airmail service, inaugurated by Highland Airways between Inverness and Kirkwall.
 12 July – Petroleum (Production) Act vests ownership of all U.K. subterranean oil and natural gas in the Crown.
 18 July – opening of the Queensway Tunnel beneath the River Mersey by King George V.
 19 July – 41 squadrons added to the Royal Air Force as part of a new air defence program.
 4–11 August – British Empire Games held at Wembley Park, London.
 6 September – the BBC's most powerful long-wave transmitter, Droitwich Transmitting Station, starts transmitting regularly at 200 kilohertz, following test transmissions from 8 May.
 10 September – the British Graham Land Expedition sets out to explore Graham Land in Antarctica.
 22 September – Gresford disaster: a gas explosion takes place at Gresford Colliery in Wrexham, north-east Wales, which leads to the death of 266 miners and rescuers, one of the worst tragedies in Welsh mining history.
 26 September – launching of the liner  at Clydebank.
 29 September – Stanley Matthews makes his debut for the England national football team, beginning a record 23-year international career.
 29 November – marriage of Prince George, Duke of Kent, to Princess Marina of Greece and Denmark, the first this century, and last, foreign-born princess to marry into the British royal family; the wedding is the first to be broadcast live on radio.
 30 November – London and North Eastern Railway steam locomotive Class A3 4472 Flying Scotsman becomes the first officially to exceed 100 miles per hour (160.9 km/h) on test in England.
 10 December – Arthur Henderson wins the Nobel Peace Prize.
 21 December – Special Areas Act provides grants from central government funds to assist regions with high unemployment.

Undated
 The "British Committee for Relations with Other Countries", which will become the British Council, is set up to foster cultural relations.
 Aero Pictorial, a British aerial photography company is founded.
 EKCO introduces its distinctive round bakelite radio cabinets.

Publications
 John Betjeman's guidebook Cornwall, first of the Shell Guides.
 Agatha Christie's novels Murder on the Orient Express (featuring Hercule Poirot) and Why Didn't They Ask Evans?.
 Robert Graves' novel I, Claudius.
 James Hilton's novel Goodbye, Mr. Chips.
 George Orwell's memoir Burmese Days.
 J. B. Priestley's travelogue English Journey.
 Dorothy L. Sayers' Lord Peter Wimsey novel The Nine Tailors.
 Dylan Thomas' first collection 18 Poems, including "The Force that Through the Green Fuse Drives the Flower".
 P. L. Travers' first children's story Mary Poppins.
 Geoffrey Trease's children's story Bows against the Barons.
 Evelyn Waugh's novel A Handful of Dust.
 P. G. Wodehouse's Thank You, Jeeves and Right Ho, Jeeves, the first Jeeves stories written as full-length novels.
 V. M. Yeates' war novel Winged Victory.

Births
 6 January – Sylvia Syms, actress (died 2023)
 8 January – Roy Kinnear, actor (died 1988)
 12 January – Mick Sullivan, English rugby league footballer (died 2016)
 14 January – Richard Briers, actor (died 2013)
 18 January – Raymond Briggs, writer and illustrator (died 2022)
 19 January – Ron Newman, British-American soccer player and manager (died 2018) 
 20 January – Tom Baker, actor
 22 January – Graham Kerr, TV cook
 25 January – George William Coventry, 11th Earl of Coventry, peer (died 2002)
 29 January – Noel Harrison, singer, actor, and Olympic skier (died 2013)
 2 February – Hugh McIlvanney, sports journalist (died 2019)
 6 February – Roger Becker, tennis player (died 2017)
 11 February
Mary Quant, fashion designer
John Surtees, racing driver and motorcyclist (died 2017)
 17 February – Alan Bates, actor (died 2003)
 19 February – David Jones, film director (died 2008)
 21 February – Michael Grylls, politician (died 2001)
 24 February – Ray Honeyford, head teacher (died 2012)
 25 February 
Bernard Bresslaw, actor (died 1993)
 Nicholas Edwards, Baron Crickhowell, politician (died 2018)
 28 February – Ronnie Moran, football captain (Liverpool F.C.) (died 2017)
 4 March – John Dunn, radio presenter (died 2004)
 5 March – Nicholas Smith, actor (died 2015)
 6 March – John Noakes, children's television presenter (died 2017)
 7 March – Zena Walker, actress (died 2003)
 8 March
 Gawaine Baillie, race car driver and industrialist (died 2003)
 John McLeod, Scottish composer (died 2022)
 11 March – Dilys Laye, actress and screenwriter (died 2009)
 15 March – Richard Layard, Baron Layard, economist
 20 March – Eric Hebborn, art forger (died 1996)
 22 March – Larry Martyn, comic actor (died 1994)
 26 March – Norman Reynolds, production designer and film director
 28 March – Laurie Taitt, Olympic sprint hurdler (died 2006)
 1 April – Marie Patterson, English trade union leader (died 2021)
 2 April – Brian Glover, actor and wrestler (died 1997)
 3 April – Jane Goodall, primatologist
 6 April – Brian Cosgrove, animator
 7 April
Ian Richardson, actor (died 2007)
Roger Webb, jazz musician (died 2002)
 11 April – Ron Pember, actor and dramatist (died 2022)
 16 April
Vince Hill, singer
Richard Kershaw, journalist (died 2014)
Geoffrey Owen, journalist, academic and businessman
 3 May – Henry Cooper, boxer (died 2011)
 5 May – Jim Reid, folk musician (died 2009)
 8 May – David Williamson, Baron Williamson of Horton, English soldier and politician (died 2015)
 9 May
Alan Bennett, playwright, screenwriter, actor and author
David Plastow, English businessman (died 2019)
Peter Ramsden, rugby league player (died 2002)
 15 May – George Roper, comedian (died 2003)
 16 May – Victor Emery, physicist (died 2002)
 24 May 
 Barry Rose, choir director and organist
 Margaret Tebbit, nurse (died 2020)
 26 May
Jeffrey Alan Gray, psychologist (died 2004)
Mike Rawson, track and field athlete (died 2000)
 29 May – Nanette Newman, actress
 5 June – Bryon Butler, sports journalist (died 2001)
 11 June – Lady Annabel Goldsmith, socialite 
 12 June – John Townend, politician (died 2018)
 16 June – Eileen Atkins, actress  
 19 June 
Terence Clark, soldier and diplomat, British Ambassador to Iraq
Brian London, boxer (died 2021)
 20 June
Brian Barder, diplomat (died 2017)
Keith Hopkins, historian and sociologist (died 2004)
 21 June
 Maggie Jones, actress (died 2009)
 Ken Matthews, race walker (died 2019)
 23 June – Keith Sutton, bishop (died 2017)
 24 June
Rodney Peppé, author and illustrator 
Peter Stoddart, English cricketer (died 2019)
 26 June – Jeremy Wolfenden, journalist and spy (died 1965)
 30 June – Richard Jolly, development economist
 1 July
Paddy Jones, salsa dancer
Jean Marsh, actress
Ian Robinson, publisher (died 2004)
 2 July – Tom Springfield, songwriter and record producer (died 2022)
 4 July – James Hamilton, 5th Duke of Abercorn, British nobleman, peer and politician
 5 July – Philip Madoc, actor (died 2012)
 7 July – Richard Taylor, medical doctor, politician and Royal Air Force officer
 8 July – Marty Feldman, writer, comedian and actor (died 1982)
 9 July – John Clegg, Indian-born English actor
 11 July – Helen Cresswell, writer (died 2005)
 13 July – Gordon Lee, football player and manager (died 2022)
 14 July – John Tyndall, politician (died 2005)
 15 July – Harrison Birtwistle, composer (died 2022)
 21 July – Jonathan Miller, polymath theatre director (died 2019)
 23 July – Tony Lee, jazz pianist (died 2004)
 28 July 
 Pat Douthwaite, artist (died 2002)
 Ron Flowers, footballer (died 2021)
 30 July – Julia Bodmer, geneticist (died 2001)
 6 August – Chris Bonington, mountaineer
 8 August – Keith Barron, actor (died 2017)
 16 August – Diana Wynne Jones, English writer (died 2011)
 18 August – Michael de Larrabeiti, writer (died 2008)
 19 August – Ronald Jones, track and field athlete (died 2021)
 20 August – Tom Mangold, journalist and author
 2 September – Allen Carr, writer and anti-smoking campaigner (died 2006)
 4 September – Clive Granger, economist, Nobel Prize laureate (died 2009)
 8 September – Peter Maxwell Davies, composer (died 2016)
 11 September 
 Ian Abercrombie, English-American actor (died 2012)
 Kallistos (Ware), Eastern Orthodox theologian and bishop (died 2022) 
 Cedric Price, architect and writer (died 2003)
 19 September
 Brian Epstein, manager of The Beatles (died 1967)
 Austin Mitchell, politician (died 2021)
 20 September – David Marquand, academic and politician
 21 September – David J. Thouless, Scottish-born condensed-matter physicist, Nobel Prize laureate (died 2019)
 24 September
 Tommy Anderson, Scottish footballer
 Robert Lang, English stage, television actor (died 2004)
 26 September – Dick Heckstall-Smith, jazz saxophonist (died 2004)
 30 September
 Alan A'Court, English footballer (died 2009)
 Anna Kashfi, Welsh actress (died 2015)
 1 October – Geoff Stephens, songwriter and record producer (died 2020)
 20 October 
 Maureen Cleave, journalist (died 2021)
 Timothy West, actor
 24 October – Wally Herbert, explorer (died 2007)
 27 October 
 David and Frederick Barclay, businessmen (David died 2021)
 Peter Donaldson, economist (died 2002)
 14 November – Dave Mackay, Scottish footballer (died 2015)
 22 November – Nicolas Walter, anarchist writer (died 2000)
 28 November – Ted Walker, poet, travel writer and broadcaster (died 2004)
 1 December – Jane Heathcote-Drummond-Willoughby, 28th Baroness Willoughby de Eresby, peer
 3 December – Bob Cryer, politician (died 1994)
 9 December – Judi Dench, actress
 17 December – Ray Wilson, footballer (died 2018)
 27 December – Pat Moss, racing driver (died 2008)
 28 December
Alasdair Gray, Scottish fiction writer and artist (died 2019)
Maggie Smith, English actress

Deaths
 6 January – Herbert Chapman, football manager (born 1878)
 23 January 
 Charles McLaren, 1st Baron Aberconway, politician and jurist (born 1850)
 Sir William Hardy, biologist and food scientist (born 1864)
 23 February – Sir Edward Elgar, composer (born 1857)
 10 March – Thomas Anstey Guthrie, comic novelist 'F. Anstey' (born 1856)
 25 March – Edmund Selous, ornithologist and writer (born 1857)
 11 April – John Collier, writer and Pre-Raphaelite painter (born 1850)
 25 May – Gustav Holst, composer (born 1874)
 10 June – Frederick Delius, composer (born 1862)
 10 September – Sir George Henschel, musician (born 1850)
 27 September – Ellen Willmott, horticulturalist (born 1858)
 3 November – Sir Robert McAlpine, 1st Baronet, builder (born 1847)
 16 November – Alice Hargreaves, née Alice Liddell, inspiration for Alice's Adventures in Wonderland (born 1852)
 25 November – N. E. Brown, English plant taxonomist (born 1849)

See also
 List of British films of 1934

References

 
Years of the 20th century in the United Kingdom
United KIngdom